3rd Canadian Infantry Battalion can refer to three units of the Canadian Army Pacific Force in 1945:
 3rd Canadian Infantry Battalion (48th Highlanders of Canada), 1st Canadian Infantry Regiment
 3rd Canadian Infantry Battalion (The Loyal Edmonton Regiment), 2nd Canadian Infantry Regiment
 3rd Canadian Infantry Battalion (The West Nova Scotia Regiment), 3rd Canadian Infantry Regiment